Agrupación Deportiva San José is a Spanish football team based in La Rinconada, Province of Sevilla, in the autonomous community of Andalusia. Founded in 1951, it plays in Primera Andaluza  – Sevilla Group, holding home matches at Felipe del Valle, with a 750-seat capacity.

Season to Season
 

3 seasons in Tercera División
25 seasons in División de Honor
4 seasons in Primera Andaluza

Former Players
 Óscar Tena

Former Coaches
 Jose Carlos

A.D. San José B

AD San José B was a reserve team of San José for two seasons, 2018–2020. The team played in Tercera Andaluza, Sevilla group 2.

Season to Season

2 seasons in Tercera Andaluza

External Links
LaPreferente team profile

FutbolRegionalES team profile

References

External Links
Official Website(In Spanish) 

Futbolme Team Profile(in Spanish)

oGol team Profile

Football teams
Football teams in Spain
Province of Seville
Andalusia